Kilby Bridge is a hamlet on the A5199 Welford Road south of the city of Leicester in the borough of Oadby and Wigston, Leicestershire, England. The population of the hamlet at the 2011 census was 36.

Geography
The hamlet has two bridges that take the Welford Road over the River Sence and the Grand Union Canal. The third bridge takes the Midland Main Line railway over the Welford Road to the north of the hamlet.

History
Mention of a stone bridge over the River Sence at Kilby Bridge can be found in records dating back to the late 13th century (c. 1282-92). Originally written as Stanbrig or Stanbric (Stone Bridge) on the river, the bridge is listed in what was then known as Kilby gate (the road to Kilby) in the Broad Meadow up to at least 1731. The Grand Union Canal arrived in the early 1790s and the railway line arrived in the mid 1850s.

Today
The commercial activities of the area include a canal side public house, the Navigation Inn, a depot owned by British Waterways, and a car dealership.

References

Hamlets in Leicestershire
Oadby and Wigston